Yet Soo War Way Lee (1853 Tungkun, Guangdong, China – 21 August 1909 Adelaide, South Australia, Australia) was a successful Chinese-Australian merchant.

Personal life 
YSW Way Lee was born in Guandong, China in 1853. He migrated to Australia in 1874, where he had family -- an uncle in Sydney. He initially spent time in Sydney and Brisbane, before settling in Adelaide. He married Margaret Ann McDonald in 1889. They had 3 children -- Vera Pretoria, Lily and Jack Ernest.

WayLee & Company 
Way Lee had one of the government contracts to supply the Ghan railway from Port Augusta to Hergott Springs/Maree.  He partnered with several other Chinese merchants, including Hu Ting, to deliver food and other supplies to the expanding railway in the late 1880s.

An Advocate and Leader 

Lee was a leader of the South Australian Chinese community who advocated for the rights of Chinese residents of Australia. He and Hu Ting authored at least one letter to the Editor during the height of the Anti-Chinese immigration debates in South Australia in the 1880s.

Further reading

References

Australian people of Chinese descent
Businesspeople from Guangdong
Australian merchants
People from Dongguan
1853 births
1909 deaths
19th-century Australian businesspeople